Thomason  is a patronymic surname meaning "son of Thomas" or a misspelling of the French surname Thomasson, Thomesson "little Thomas". Thomason is an American surname. There are varied spellings. Notable people with the surname include:

Art Thomason (1889–1944), American baseball player
Bob Thomason, basketball coach at the University of the Pacific.
Bobby Thomason (1928–2013), American football player
Sergeant Clyde A. Thomason (1914–1942), United States Marine and Medal of Honor awardee
Dustin Thomason, American writer
George Thomason (died 1666), English book collector
Harry Thomason (born 1940), American film and television producer
James Thomason (1804–1853), British Lieutenant-Governor of the North-Western Provinces in India
Jasin Thomason (born 1976), guitarist for American rock band The Ataris
Jeff Thomason (born 1969), American football tight end
Jim Thomason (1920–2007), American football halfback
John Thomason (1893–1944), United States Marine and author
Mackenzie Thomason, Canadian politician
Marsha Thomason (born 1976), English actress
R. Ewing Thomason (1879–1973), American politician and Speaker of the Texas House of Representatives
Robert Wayne Thomason (1952–1995), American mathematician
Roy Thomason (born 1944), British Conservative Party politician
Sarah Thomason, American linguist
Trent Thomason (born 1972), Christian keyboardist and songwriter
Theresa Thomason, American gospel singer
Yeoville Thomason (1826–1901), Birmingham architect
Linda Bloodworth-Thomason (born 1947), American writer and television producer
Lorene Thomason Coates, Democratic member of the North Carolina General Assembly
Sir Wilfred Thomason Grenfell (1865–1940), medical missionary to Newfoundland and Labrador

See also
George Thomason
Thomasson (surname)

Patronymic surnames
Surnames from given names